The Orchestra of St John's is an orchestra in the United Kingdom, founded in 1967 by John Lubbock. Originally called the Orchestra of St John's Smith Square, it was named after St John's, Smith Square in central London.

The Orchestra has worked with British soloists including Dame Felicity Lott, Tasmin Little, John Lill and Stephen Kovacevich, and also aims to provide a platform for new musicians, including performers such as Julian Bliss and Chloë Hanslip.

The Orchestra has held its own music festival each year at Dorchester Abbey in Oxfordshire since 2003, and also promotes concerts in London.  These have included a one-hour series of early evening concerts at Cadogan Hall as well as performances at St John's, Smith Square, the South Bank Centre and regular appearances at the BBC Proms.

The Orchestra has also featured on two albums by the rock group Radiohead: the Grammy award-winning Kid A and Grammy-nominated Amnesiac.  OSJ performed the première of Escape Velocity by Benjamin Wallfisch at the 2006 BBC Proms festival. The composer Matthew King also collaborated with the orchestra and the savant pianist Derek Paravicini on a piano concerto entitled Blue in 2011.

References

British orchestras
Musical groups established in 1967
1967 establishments in the United Kingdom